The Great Mosque of Diyarbakır ( or) was built by the Seljuk Sultan Malik-Shah I over an older mosque, and is considered by Muslim scholars to be the fifth holiest site in Islam after the Great Mosque of Damascus, which it is stylised after.
It can accommodate up to 5,000 worshippers and hosts four different Islamic traditions.

History

Great Mosque of Diyarbakir is the oldest and one of the most significant mosques in Mesopotamia. Following the Muslim capture of Diyarbakir in 639 during the reign of the second Caliph Umar, a mosque was built, but the building fell into disuse and ruin sometime later. Even after the conversion of the church into the mosque, it was used by both Muslims and Christians.

In 1091 Sultan Malik Shah directed the local Seljuk governor Maidud Davla to rebuild a mosque on the site. Completed in 1092, the mosque is similar to and heavily influenced by the Umayyad Great Mosque in Damascus (which was repaired by Malik Shah in the twelfth century prior to work in Diyarbakir). The influence of the Damascus mosque brought Syrian architecture and decoration to Anatolia.

Seljuq Sultan Malik-Shah altered the Great Mosque of Diyarbakir as a means of bringing the prestige and glory from Damascus, the capital city of Syria, to Diyarbakir in the south of Turkey. The design influenced by the Umayyad Mosque in Damascus, used the locally found black basalt rock. The city of Diyarbakir went through numerous occupations by various conquering empires due to its prime geographical position and proximity to both neighboring allies and enemies of many of its conquerors.

The mosque is considered by Muslim scholars to be the fifth holiest site in Islam after the Great Mosque of Damascus. It can accommodate up to 5,000 worshippers and is famous for hosting four different Islamic traditions.

Renovations and Dating of the Mosque 
The mosque underwent a series of renovations after an earthquake in 1115 CE and then a fire in 1155 CE. There are dates scripted into the west side of the courtyard which include the dates, 117-1118 CE, and 1124 CE. They are believed to be markers of the renovation dates. Byzantine spolia including pieces containing Greek carvings are found in parts of the Mosque. Later renovations include additions from the eighteenth century under the Ottoman Empire, such as the stone used in the mihrab set in the middle of the qibla wall.  The minaret, constructed in 1839, was also a later addition. The fountain in the courtyard was from in 1849.

While there is no inscription found in the mosque that can date back to the original construction, there are inscriptions referencing repairs made, such as the ones mentioned above. The oldest inscription, which is located on the western façade of the prayer hall, shows Malik Shah and is dated to 1091-2 CE. Mattheos of Urfa, a 12th century Armenian history, wrote in his work that a fire severely damaged the building in 115-16 CE. This information, as well as the architectural style, has led historians to believe that the original structure was established in the first half of the 11th century.

Courtyard 

The courtyard of the mosque is bound on both the east and west sides by porticoes. Its floor is paved with basalt blocks, with the mosque located on the south side of the courtyard. The main entrance of the mosque can be found through a portal on its eastern side. The mosque's eastern and western porticoes each has two stories. Both porticoes own intricate and beautiful stone carvings. The north façade is shorter compared to the other two facades and contains only one story. The south façade, on the other hand, is divided into three unique sections. Two sections are lateral arms, each being only one story high. The two arms are then split in the center by a section that rises more than twice the height of the arms.

Kufic inscriptions found on the building's exteriors record in detail the rebuilding and additions made to the complex throughout its long history. Lavish carving and decoration of the columns in the courtyard are one of the distinguishing features of the Great Mosque. The western arcade of the courtyard includes the first use of the broken arch.The columns of the courtyard's facades made from four rock types; pre-Tertiary met ophiolite, Eocene limestones, Miocene limestones, and Poli-Quaternary basalts. While the mosque underwent numerous reconstructions and suffered much damage since its establishment, the original columns were reused during the reconstruction periods of the Great Mosque. This was proven by the lengths of the columns existing in segmented forms, the varied column lengths, and the use of different materials the columns are made of. The columns were originally thought to be structural, but later considered to be in place for either partial support or simply for decoration.

The East Maqsura is a two story structure located on the eastern portion of the courtyard, and is covered with timber and a tile covered roof. Attached to the courtyard's northern side is the Mesudiya Madrasa.

Prayer hall 

The prayer hall is a wide interior space with three aisles running parallel to the qibla wall (the southern wall, which stands in the direction of prayer). The aisles are divided in the middle by a large central nave which runs perpendicular to the qibla wall. At the southern end of this nave, in the middle of the qibla wall, is the main mihrab. The nave's ceiling features painted decoration. On the outside, the prayer hall is topped by a pitched roof covered with lead plating. The roof of the central nave rises above the rest of the roof on either side. The prayer hall's courtyard façade has two wings on either side which are each pierced with two doors and five windows, while in the middle is a much taller façade corresponding to the central nave inside. The courtyard façade is decorated with garland and meander motifs, as well as an inscription with floral Kufic calligraphy.

Great Mosque of Damascus Comparison 

The Umayyad Mosque in Damascus is one of the earliest mosques, and has remained culturally important. Many believe the mosque has served as a prototype for or inspired many mosques later built across the Islamic world, the Great Mosque of Diyarbakır included. While it is easy to spot the similarities between the two, significant differences also exist.

Unlike the Great Mosque of Damascus, the Great Mosque of Diyarbakır does not have a dome in the center of its prayer hall. Over the course of history, Turkey has altered the method of covering mosques with large domes, a tradition since the Ottoman period. This is believed to establish a uniquely Turkish style, one that is distinct from the Arabic style of mosque architecture. The Great Mosque of Diyarbakır also has thick pillars instead of the round columns often found in Syria, and lacks certain ornamentation in its mosaics.

The Great Mosque of Diyarbakir is enclosed and its interior space is not visible from the outside. The mosque's minaret was possibly modeled after Christian bell towers. The proportions of the courtyard and prayer hall, as well as the eastern entrance, and the plan of the prayer hall with its central nave and lateral arms are all similar to the Damascus mosque.

When the two mosques are compared, many consider the Great Mosque of Diyarbakır a more modest structure. Some find its architectural features more suitable for reasons of piety. This particular style can also be found in Aleppo and Hama Syria, and other cities of importance in the Islamic world.

Gallery

See also 
 List of Turkish Grand Mosques

References

External links

 Extensive picture gallery of the mosque

Mosques converted from churches in the Ottoman Empire
Mosques in Diyarbakır
Buildings and structures in Diyarbakır
Tourist attractions in Diyarbakır Province
Mosques completed in 1092
Sur, Diyarbakır
Diyarbakir
11th-century mosques